"Love II Love" is the third single from British boy band Damage and the second single taken from their 1997 debut album, Forever. It is widely regarded as the band's breakthrough single, having peaked at  12 on the UK Singles Chart and No. 82 in the United States, where it is their only charting single. The song also appeared on the singles charts of Australia, Germany, and New Zealand.

Music video
The music video shows the band being strung up by a woman with alien-like characteristics, and being controlled like puppets. Many believe this was the inspiration for 'N Sync's "Bye Bye Bye" music video, released four years later in 2000.

Track listings

UK CD single
 "Love II Love" 
 "Love II Love" 
 "Love II Love" 
 "All Season Lover"

UK 12-inch single
A1. "Love II Love" 
A2. "All Season Lover"
B1. "Love II Love" 
B2. "Love II Love" 

UK cassette single
 "Love II Love" 
 "All Season Lover"

US CD single
 "Love II Love"  — 4:06
 "Love II Love"  — 4:02

US 12-inch single
A1. "Love II Love"  — 5:16
A2. "Love II Love"  — 4:41
A3. "Love II Love"  — 4:53
B1. "Love II Love"  — 7:26
B2. "Love II Love"  — 4:02
B3. "Love II Love"  — 4:06

US cassette single
 "Love II Love"

Charts

Release history

References

External links
 Damage on BBC Music
 [ Biography at Allmusic.com]
 

1996 singles
1996 songs
Big Life Records singles
Damage (British band) songs
Song recordings produced by Cutfather & Joe
Songs written by Ali Tennant
Songs written by Wayne Hector